Nicotine withdrawal is a group of symptoms that occur in the first few weeks after stopping or decreasing use of nicotine. Symptoms include intense cravings for nicotine, anger or irritability, anxiety, depression, impatience, trouble sleeping, restlessness, hunger or weight gain, and difficulty concentrating. Withdrawal symptoms make it harder to quit nicotine products, and most methods for quitting smoking involve reducing nicotine withdrawal. Quit smoking programs can make it easier to quit. Nicotine withdrawal is recognized in both the American Psychiatric Association Diagnostic and Statistical Manual and the WHO International Classification of Diseases.

Signs and symptoms
The most documented symptoms of nicotine withdrawal are cravings for nicotine, anger or irritability, anxiety, depression, impatience, trouble sleeping, restlessness (psychomotor agitation, including indeliberate movement), hunger or weight gain, and difficulty concentrating. Symptoms are usually strongest for the first few days and then dissipate over 2–4 weeks. The most common symptoms are irritability, anxiety, and difficulty concentrating. Depression and insomnia are the least common. Other withdrawal symptoms may include anhedonia, constipation, cough, decreased positive affect, dizziness, drowsiness, headache, impulsivity, fatigue, flu symptoms, mood swings, mouth ulcers, and increased dreaming. Cessation of nicotine can also require changes in levels of various medications.

Definition
Nicotine withdrawal refers to the effects that nicotine-dependent individuals experience after they discontinue or decrease nicotine use. Nicotine is an addictive substance found most commonly in tobacco and tobacco products including cigarettes, cigars, chewing tobacco, e-cigarette liquid, pipe tobacco, snus, snuff, and nicotine medications such as nicotine gum. Withdrawal is the body’s reaction to not having the nicotine it had become accustomed to. Withdrawal is most common and intense in cigarette smokers and intermediate in smokeless and e-cigarette users. The symptoms of nicotine withdrawal usually appear 2–3 hours after last intake of nicotine and peak in 2–3 days. In a minority of smokers, cravings may last for years. Nicotine withdrawal causes few physical signs and is not life-threatening but associated cravings can be as severe as withdrawal from other drugs. After the initial withdrawal period, anxiety, depression, and quality of life generally improve such that former smokers are better off than continuing smoking.

Causes
Various causes have been proposed to explain the causes of nicotine withdrawal. Nicotine binds to nicotinic receptors in the brain that, in turn, cause an increase in dopamine. Dopamine is the major chemical that stimulates reward centers in the brain. The brain recruits an opposing force to dampen the effects of nicotine and this causes tolerance (the reduction in the effect of nicotine). The onset of this opposing force and the fact that the brain becomes used to and dependent on nicotine to function normally is known as physical dependence. When nicotine intake is decreased, the brain's opposing force is now unopposed and this causes withdrawal symptoms. It also appears that opiate, serotonergic, glutamic, cannabinoid, and corticotrophin receptors may play a role in nicotine withdrawal. In addition, smoking becomes conditioned to environmental cues that can then prompt withdrawal symptoms. In the brain, the dorsal striatum may be associated with physical (motor) but not affective withdrawal sign.

Treatment
Gradually reducing nicotine intake causes less withdrawal than abruptly stopping. Another way to reduce nicotine withdrawal symptoms is to provide the body with an alternative source of nicotine (nicotine replacement therapy) for a temporary period and then taper this new nicotine intake. Other medication used for quitting smoking include bupropion, varenicline, cytisine, nortriptyline, and clonidine and psychedelics. Treatments other than medication, such as increased exercise, can also reduce nicotine withdrawal. Many behavior changes such as avoiding situations where one usually smoked, planning ahead to deal with temptations, and seeking the support of friends and family are effective in helping people quit smoking, but whether this is due to reduced withdrawal is unclear.

Epidemiology
Most nicotine users have at least one of the above withdrawal symptoms when they try to stop. These effects are much milder to those who use isolated nicotine over tobacco. Withdrawal can occur in less frequent  users, but heavier users and those with a past or current psychiatric disorder tend to have more severe withdrawal. Genetics also influence the severity of withdrawal.

See also
Withdrawal
Smoking cessation
Nicotine dependence

References

External links 

Smoking cessation
Withdrawal syndromes